Fort Logan, Colorado is a neighborhood of Englewood, Colorado south of Denver and is named for the former Fort Logan military post of the area.

In 1889, the town of Fort Logan was established that included the base and surrounding land.

References

Neighborhoods in Colorado
Englewood, Colorado